Strath Fillan Priory was a small Augustinian Priory based at Strath Fillan in Argyll (now in the Stirling council area). It seems to have been founded in 1318 by Robert I, King of Scots, and given to the canons of Inchaffray Abbey in order to properly celebrate St Fillan, a saint popular with the 14th century kings of Scotland.  It had royal patronage, but by 1607 it was a Campbell possession, when it was incorporated into the secular lordship of Archibald (Gilleasbaig) Campbell of Glencarradale.

References
 Cowan, Ian B. & Easson, David E., Medieval Religious Houses: Scotland With an Appendix on the Houses in the Isle of Man, Second Edition, (London, 1976), p. 98
 Watt, D.E.R. & Shead, N.F. (eds.), The Heads of Religious Houses in Scotland from the 12th to the 16th Centuries, The Scottish Records Society, New Series, Volume 24, (Edinburgh, 2001), pp. 207–8

See also
 Prior of Strath Fillan

Augustinian monasteries in Scotland
Religious organizations established in the 1310s
1318 establishments in Scotland
Buildings and structures in Stirling (council area)
History of Stirling (council area)
Christian monasteries established in the 14th century
Scheduled Ancient Monuments in Stirling
Former Christian monasteries in Scotland